Jack Dempsey cichlids (Rocio octofasciata) are aggressive aquarium fish named after the heavyweight boxer Jack Dempsey. They are native to Central America but were discovered in a flooded quarry in New South Wales (NSW) Australia in 2004. Although efforts were made to eradicate them in 2004 and 2005, the fish remain. Jack Dempsey cichlids are one of about 30 aquarium fish species that have become established in Australian waterways, and have been shown to have a significant impact on Australian aquatic ecosystems. They highlight the importance of preventing the importation of invasive fish species because they are extremely difficult or impossible to eradicate once they become established in the wild.

Description
Jack Dempsey cichlids are a medium-sized fish which can be distinguished from other cichlids by the presence of two grey-black bars on the top of their head which extend forward between their eyes. Their background colour is dark blue and they have a series of white to iridescent blue spots on their fins, head and body, and a series of dark bars along their sides.

In Australia, they are a popular aquarium fish typically sold to tropical freshwater tanks, although their aggressive nature means they ‘are not suitable for community tanks’. They can live more than 10 years and can reach 25 cm in length. They prefer temperatures of between 22 and 30oC, but can survive in temperatures as low as 8-10oC.

Jack Dempsey cichlids feed opportunistically on a range of organisms including insects, worms, crayfish, molluscs, small fish and algae. In the wild they are found in warm murky water including mangroves and the lower reaches of rivers and streams.  Females lay approximately 500-800 eggs per clutch. The eggs are protected by both parents, which are extremely aggressive towards other fish during the spawning season.

Australian occurrence
A population of Jack Dempsey cichlids was found in early 2004 in the Angourie area, near Yamba on the NSW north coast. This population is confined to an isolated flooded quarry locally known as the ‘Green Pool’. There are no other known naturalised populations of Jack Dempsey cichlids in Australia. Because Jack Dempsey cichlids are popular pets there is little doubt that this population established from illegally released aquarium fish.

Eradication attempts
When Jack Dempseys were first discovered in the Green Pool, Angourie the NSW Department of Primary Industries (DPI) considered them to be a good target for eradication because the pool was relatively small, confined, and contained few native fish. Three eradication attempts were carried out between September 2004 and June 2005 using explosives. Large Australian bass were then released into the pool to prey on any remaining larvae or juveniles that were not killed by the blasts.

Follow up monitoring by the NSW DPI has found Jack Dempsey cichlids remain in the pool. It is possible that some fish survived eradication attempts or that they were deliberately re-introduced.  According to the NSW DPI, no further eradication work is planned.

Impacts
The features that make cichlids popular pets are also those that contribute to their invasive potential: ‘they are hardy, adaptable and breed prolifically’.

Cichlids have the potential to dominate native fish populations through their aggressive behaviour and competition for food and space.  They eat almost anything smaller than themselves, including fish, invertebrates and frogs . As relatively large and aggressive carnivores they could have devastating impacts on native fish populations if they spread to other waterways, such as the nearby Clarence River.

Cichlids also have the potential to introduce disease into wild fish populations. Many pathogens and parasites have been recorded in imported ornamental fish in quarantine and post-quarantine in Australia.

Social and economic impacts include the costs of control, impacts on recreationally valued fish, including the spread of disease.

Biosecurity
There are growing concerns about the ongoing importation of aquarium fish such as Jack Dempsey chichlids into Australia. More than two-thirds of naturalised non-native fish in Australia are thought to have come from the aquarium trade, and non-native fish species are ‘implicated in the decline of 42 per cent of Australian native fish and several frog species’. On the basis of significant potential impacts on biodiversity, the Australian Government's Threatened Species Scientific Committee determined that the process of introducing fish outside their natural geographic distribution met the criteria for listing as a key threatening process (KTP). However, the process has not yet been listed as a KTP, and several hundred aquarium fish species continue to be permitted for import into Australia, including more than 250 fresh water species. In 2004-05 alone, 15 million fish were imported.

According to experts, a large part of the problem stems from inadequate import assessments and controls. For example, an extensive review of introduced aquarium fish in Australia concluded that assessments are ‘based on information obtained overseas and are likely to be of limited value in predicting the likelihood of environmental impacts in Australian waters’.  In assessing the case for revised import controls – particularly in the context of introduced diseases, scientists recommended that ‘the number of species traded and the number of sources permitted need to be dramatically reduced to facilitate hazard identification, risk assessment and import quarantine controls.’

References

Cichlasomatinae
Introduced fish species
Invasive animal species in Australia